The 22873 / 74 Digha–Visakhapatnam Express is a Superfast train belonging to Indian Railways East Coast Railway zone that runs between  and  in India.

It operates as train number 22873  from Digha to Visakhapatnam and as train number 22874 in the reverse direction, serving the states of  West Bengal, Odisha & Andhra Pradesh.

Coaches
The 22873 / 74 Digha–Visakhapatnam Express has one AC 2 tier, two AC 3 tier, eight sleeper coaches, six general unreserved & two SLR (seating with luggage rake) coaches . It does not carry a pantry car.

As is customary with most train services in India, coach composition may be amended at the discretion of Indian Railways depending on demand.

Service

Routing

Traction
As the route is electrified, a Visakhapatnam-based WAP-4 electric locomotive pulls the train to its destination.

References

External links
22873  Digha–Visakhapatnam Express at India Rail Info
22874 Visakhapatnam–Digha Express at India Rail Info

Express trains in India
Transport in Digha
Rail transport in West Bengal
Rail transport in Odisha
Rail transport in Andhra Pradesh
Transport in Visakhapatnam